Great Days: The John Prine Anthology is a compilation album by American folk singer John Prine, released in 1993.

Reception

Allmusic critic Steven Thomas Erlewine called the album an excellent summary of Prine's prime period (1971-1991), and "this provides a nearly flawless recap of his career - so much so that it's not only for neophytes, but also reminds longtime fans why they loved him in the first place." Music critic Robert Christgau also praised the compilation, writing "There aren't 41 best Prine songs. There are 50, 60, maybe more; the only way to resolve quibbles would be a bigger box than commerce or decorum permits...Prine's a lot friendlier than your average thriving old singer-songwriter (Young, Thompson, Cohen), and his disinclination to downplay his natural warmth or his folk-rock retro may make him impenetrable to victims of irony proficiency amnesia."

Track listing
All songs by John Prine unless otherwise noted.
Disc 1
"Illegal Smile" – 3:13
"Spanish Pipedream" – 2:41
"Hello In There" – 4:32
"Sam Stone" – 4:16
"Paradise" – 3:15
"Donald and Lydia" – 4:30
"The Late John Garfield Blues" – 3:06
"Yes I Guess They Oughta Name a Drink After You" – 2:10
"The Great Compromise" – 4:56
"Sweet Revenge" – 2:41
"Please Don't Bury Me" – 2:51
"Christmas in Prison" – 3:13
"Dear Abby" – 4:22 (live)
"Blue Umbrella" – 3:31
"Common Sense" – 3:11
"Come Back to Us Barbara Lewis Hare Krishna Beauregard" – 3:20
"Saddle in the Rain" – 3:35
"He Was in Heaven Before He Died" – 2:16
"Fish and Whistle" – 3:15
"That's the Way That the World Goes 'Round" – 3:22
"Bruised Orange (Chain of Sorrow)" – 5:20
Tracks #1–6 are originally from John Prine
Tracks #7–9 are originally from Diamonds in the Rough
Tracks #10–14 are originally from Sweet Revenge
Tracks #15–18 are originally from Common Sense
Tracks #19–21 are originally from Bruised Orange

Disc 2
"Sabu Visits the Twin Cities Alone" – 2:55
"Automobile" – 4:23
"Killing the Blues" (Roly Salley) – 4:38
"Down by the Side of the Road" – 5:04
"Living in the Future" – 3:26
"It's Happening to You" (Prine, John Burns) – 2:19
"Storm Windows" – 5:07
"One Red Rose" – 3:19
"Souvenirs" – 3:33
"Aimless Love" – 3:08
"The Oldest Baby in the World" (Prine, Donnie Fritts) – 3:07
"People Puttin' People Down" – 2:50
"Unwed Fathers" (Prine, Bobby Braddock) – 3:32
"Angel from Montgomery" – 4:34 (live)
"Linda Goes to Mars" – 3:10
"Bad Boy" – 3:30
"Speed of the Sound of Loneliness" – 3:31 (live)
"It's a Big Old Goofy World" – 5:24 (live)
"The Sins of Memphisto" – 4:14
"All the Best" – 3:28
Track #1 is originally from Bruised Orange
Tracks #2–4 are originally from Pink Cadillac
Tracks #5–8 are originally from Storm Windows
Track #9 is originally from Affordable Art by Steve Goodman
Tracks #10–13 are originally from Aimless Love
Track #14 is originally from A Tribute to Steve Goodman
Tracks #15–16 are originally from German Afternoons
Track #17 is originally from John Prine Live
Track #18 is originally from The Best of Mountain Stage Live, Volume 2
Tracks #19–20 are originally from The Missing Years

Personnel
John Prine – vocals, guitar, backing vocals
Kenny Ascher – piano
Barry Beckett – piano
David Briggs – organ, piano
David Bromberg – guitar, dobro
James Brown – organ
Al Bunetta – percussion
Steve Burgh – bass, drums, guitar
John Burns – guitar, backing vocals
Paul Cannon – guitar
Tommy Cathey – bass
Peter Bunetta – drums
Gene Chrisman – drums
Johnny Christopher – guitar
Lewis Collins – horn
Mailto Correa – conga
Steve Cropper – guitar
Philip Donnelly – guitar
Pat Coulter – backing vocals
Stuart Duncan – fiddle, mandolin
Donald "Duck" Dunn – bass
Bobby Emmons – organ
Howie Epstein – guitar, percussion
Chuck Fiore – bass
Steve Fishell – pedal steel guitar
Donnie Fritts – piano
Bob Glaub – bass
Steve Goodman – guitar, backing vocals, harmony vocals
Jack Hale – horn
Alan Hand – piano
Glen D. Hardin – piano
James Harrah – guitar
Bishop Heywood – percussion
Robert Hoban – fiddle, piano, backing vocals
Wayne Jackson – horn
John Jorgenson – guitar, mandolin
Leo LeBlanc – pedal steel guitar
Mike Leech – bass
Howard Levy – organ, harmonica, accordion, saxophone
Andrew Love – horn
Lyle Lovett - vocals
Raun MacKinnon – vocals, backing vocals, harmony vocals
Jay Dee Maness – steel guitar
Grady Martin – dobro
Hugh McDonald – bass
James Mitchell – horn
Larry Muhoberac – piano
Dee Murray – bass
Phil Parlapiano – accordion
Rachel Peer-Prine – bass, backing vocals, harmony vocals
Tom Piekarske – bass, backing vocals
Dave Prine – fiddle, guitar, vocals
Bonnie Raitt – guitar, backing vocals, harmony vocals
Joe Romersa – drums, percussion
Jim Rooney – guitar, backing vocals
Neal Rosengarden – bass
Jim Rothermel – clarinet, recorder, saxophone, human whistle, penny whistle
Johnny Lee Schell – bass, backing vocals, harmony vocals
John Sebastian – harmonica
Jerry Shook – harmonica
Corky Siegel – piano
Bobby Whitlock – organ, piano
Bobby Woods – piano
Rick Vito – guitar, slide guitar
Reggie Young – guitar
Sid Sims – bass
Steve Spear – bass
Benmont Tench – organ, bass
Mike Utley – organ
Tom Radtke – drums, percussion
Tony Newman – drums
Angie Varias – drums
Kevin Wells – drums
Kenny Malone – drums, tambourine
Steve Mosley – drums
Helen Bernard – backing vocals
Bob Bowker – backing vocals
Jackson Browne – backing vocals
Liz Byrnes – backing vocals, harmony vocals
Judy Clay – backing vocals
Len Dressler – backing vocals
Phyllis Duncan – backing vocals
Gwen Edwards – backing vocals
Glenn Frey – backing vocals
Kitty Haywood – backing vocals
Bonnie Herman – backing vocals
Diane Holmes – backing vocals
Cissy Houston – backing vocals
Vicki Hubley – backing vocals
Brooks Hunnicutt – backing vocals
Bonnie Koloc – backing vocals, harmony vocals
Greg Prestopino – backing vocals
J.D. Souther – backing vocals
Don Shelton – backing vocals
Deidre Tuck – backing vocals
Jennifer Warnes – backing vocals
Beverly White – backing vocals
Matthew Wilder – backing vocals

Production notes
Ken Perry – remastering
Gary Peterson – research
Bill Inglot – remastering
Carl Marsh – arranger
David Fricke – liner notes
Geoff Gans – artwork

References

1993 compilation albums
John Prine albums
Rhino Records compilation albums